Homelessness in California is considered a major social issue.

In 2017, California had 22% of the nation's homeless in a state whose residents make up only 12% of the country's total population. The California State Auditor found in their April 2018 report Homelessness in California, that the U.S. Department of Housing and Urban Development noted that "California had about 134,000 homeless individuals, which represented about 24 percent of the total homeless population in the nation."  The California State Auditor is an independent government agency responsible for analyzing California economic activities and then issuing reports.

The Sacramento Bee notes that large cities like Los Angeles and San Francisco both attribute their increases in homeless to the housing shortage.  In 2017, homeless persons in California numbered 135,000 (a 15% increase from 2015). This number and figure increased in a January 2021 according to a report by an estimate done by the United States Department of Housing and Urban Development, which found that over 161,000 homeless people in California were counted.

A 2022 study found that differences in per capita homelessness rates across the United States are not due to mental illness, drug addiction, or poverty, but to differences in the cost of housing, with West Coast cities including San Francisco, Los Angeles and San Diego having homelessness rates five times that of areas with much lower housing costs like Arkansas, West Virginia, and Detroit, even though the latter locations have high burdens of opioid addiction and poverty.

Background
Homelessness has been an ongoing issue in the United States since the Industrial Revolution and is a major concern for contemporary U.S society. The state of California has one of the highest concentrations of homelessness in the United States. As agricultural migrations have occurred and with urbanization spreading, empirical research and data analysis will be pivotal in understanding the major causes of homelessness. Current research has proven that people entering homelessness after the age of fifty, become homeless for environmental purposes rather than mental illness and substance abuse.

As the baby boomer generation retires and housing costs and financial crisis become more rampant and prevalent, understanding the difference between environmental causes versus traditional causes such as mental illness and drug addiction will be necessary. Individuals who first became homeless before age 50 had a higher prevalence of recent mental health and substance use problems and more difficulty performing instrumental activities of daily living (p. 1)”.

The homeless are extra susceptible to disease because of the unhygienic and close quarters they live in, no matter if they are in shelters or on the street. Common health problems within the homeless population in California are diabetes, HIV infections, drug and alcohol addiction, skin disorders, and mental diseases. They also have a 20–30 years shorter lifespan than average. In a Health Care for the Homeless survey, 73% of the participants had at least one unmet health need, including things like prescription medication and dental care. In 2017, homeless people made around 100,000 visits to California hospitals. There are not many successful and organized homeless projects that address their health needs effectively, but one notable project is the 2012 New Genesis project in Los Angeles county, which provided mental and physical health services along with SUD treatment.

It was reported in The Atlantic in March 2019 that outbreaks of "Medieval diseases" such as tuberculosis and typhus are spreading in homeless shelters throughout California. These outbreaks have been described as a "public-health crisis" and a "disaster" by public health officials who are concerned they might spread into the general population.

The extent of the homelessness in California has been linked to increased visibility of individuals without any form of shelter in the 1980s. Some scholars have attributed to the rise of the crack epidemic in the 1980s while others attribute this to a lack of affordable housing becoming more prevalent in the 1980s as well.

Insufficient housing 
In a 2022 book titled “Homelessness is a Housing Problem,” Clayton Page Aldern (a policy analyst and data scientist in Seattle) and Gregg Colburn (an assistant professor of real estate at the University of Washington’s College of Built Environments) studied per capita homelessness rates across the country along with what possible factors might be influencing the rates and found that high rates of homelessness are caused by shortages of affordable housing, not by mental illness, drug addiction, or poverty.

They found that mental illness, drug addiction and poverty occur nationwide, but not all places have equally expensive housing costs. One example cited is that two states with high rates of opioid addiction, Arkansas and West Virginia, both have low per capita rates of homelessness, because of low housing prices.  With respect to poverty, the city of Detroit is one of the poorest cities, yet Detroit's per capita homelessness rate is 20% that of West Coast cities like Seattle, Portland, San Francisco, Los Angeles, and San Diego.

Count
The United States Interagency Council on Homelessness estimated that there were over 129 thousand homeless people on any given day in California in 2018. As of 2020, it is around 160,000 people. This is less than 0.5% of the total population, but far more than any other state in the union.  Factors that contribute to homelessness are mental health, addiction, tragic life occurrences, as well as poverty, job loss and affordable housing.  According to the National Low Income Housing Coalition (2018), there is no state that has an adequate supply of affordable housing.  California has been identified as having only 22 homes for every 100 (nlihc.org) of the lowest income renters, putting the housing shortage in California at over 1 million homes. While programs to help the homeless do exist at the city, county, state and federal levels, these programs have not ended homelessness.

Political action

Involuntary Conservatorship and Incarceration 
Former state Assemblyman Mike Gatto proposed in a 2018 opinion piece that a new form of detention be created as a method to force drug addicted and mentally ill homeless persons (which make up two-thirds of California's homeless population) off the streets and into treatment, as well as to lengthen the jail terms for misdemeanors.

As the number of homeless people increased, the problem emerged as a major issue during the governor's race in 2018. Shortage in affordable housing contributes to the increasing numbers of homelessness as well as assisted and support programs to help this population maintain a course of action towards improvement. CALmatters, 2018, addresses three stages of homelessness as: “Chronic, Transitional, and Episodic.”

Hospital discharge plans 
In 2019, California Governor Jerry Brown passed Senate Bill 1152, declaring that hospitals must come up with a discharge plan for homeless patients before discharging and ensure that they have food, shelter, medicine, and clothes for their posthospital care. This bill addressed the problem of homeless people not being able to heal properly or call back once discharged from the hospital. While many of the homeless are eligible for free health insurance from Medi-Cal, there is confusion surrounding how to apply and many other difficulties the homeless must address first, causing many homeless to not have health insurance.

Project Roomkey and Homekey 
Project Roomkey is a homeless relief program designed to mitigate the spread of the COVID-19 virus among the homeless population. It began in March 2020, with funding largely coming from FEMA. The program was slated to end in late 2020, but was continued with state and local funding. The program housed the homeless in vacant motel or hotel rooms, particularly those aged 65 or older or who had an underlying medical condition.

Project Homekey is a homeless relief program established as a continuation of Roomkey. Phase one of the initiative received $600 million in funding combined from the United States federal government's Coronavirus Aid Relief Fund (CARES Act) and California's general fund, and ended in December 2020. Homekey focuses on the creation of low-cost housing by repurposing hotels, motels, vacant apartments, and other buildings.

On July 19, 2021, California Governor Gavin Newsom signed a $12 billion bill to "fight" homelessness. Of the total, $150 million would be set aside to continue Project Roomkey, and $5.8 billion would go to building new housing units for phase two of Project Homekey.

Public Bathrooms 

According to the Right to Restrooms Act of 2021, it is required of every public agency that fits the criteria to have bathroom facilities available for the public. It is also stated that these bathrooms should be provided without any cost or charge.

Safe places to camp

Poor Farms and Asylums

Forced mental-health and addiction treatment 
California Assembly Bill 2830 which would have enabled cities and family's to push people into court ordered mental health treatment.  A pivot away from the "housing first" strategy, critics have called the bill "misguided" and "immoral".    A companion bill to SB 1338 which would set up "CARE courts", aimed at expanding the bureaucracy of service provision to include judges and lawyers, and includes sanctions for cities that do not comply with the program.  Families, clinicians, first-responders, and other behavior control specialists may initiate a petition, and after a clinical assessment, a judge would be authorized to mandate up to 24 months of court-ordered medication, substance abuse treatment, and housing.  Gavin Newson calls it a "moral responsibility", and a bipartisan group of mayors has given tentative support.

Hotel California

Counties

Los Angeles

In June 2019, Los Angeles County officials reported over 58,000 homeless in the county. In its January 2013 census, the county counted 39,463 people sleeping on the street or in homeless shelters. When including persons sleeping on private property with permission to stay no more than 90 days, the total estimated number of homeless in Los Angeles County was 57,737 in 2013. The number of people in the latter category, called "precariously housed" or "at risk of homelessness", was estimated by means of a telephone survey. The number of homeless in Los Angeles County, including the precariously housed and at risk of homelessness, was 51,340 in 2011, of which 23,539 were in the City of Los Angeles, and 4,316 were in the 50 block area east of downtown Los Angeles known as Skid Row. It is estimated that 190,207 people are homeless in Los Angeles County at least one night during the year.

The 2013 census notes that 31.4% of the homeless in Los Angeles County are substance abusers, 30.2% are mentally ill, and 18.2% have a physical disability. The census also notes that 68.2% of the homeless are male, 38% are African American, 37% are Caucasian, 28% are Hispanic, and 57.6% are between 25 and 54 years old. By 2015, there were an estimated 44 thousand homeless living in Los Angeles. Homelessness jumped to a record level of more than 55,000 people living in shelters and on the streets in May 2017. On a given night, about 12,934 homeless people stay in a shelter.

The Board of Supervisors of Los Angeles County wrote to the State Legislature asking that the California "pass a resolution urging the Governor to declare a state of emergency with respect to homelessness" in June 2016. In 2019, California governor Gavin Newsom fulfilled this request. Los Angeles County Supervisor Mark Ridley-Thomas in an opinion piece said that homelessness has reached emergency levels in Los Angeles County, with over 900 people dying on the streets in 2018, and over a thousand projected to die in 2019. Exposure to the elements cuts the lifespan of those who survive on the streets by 20 years. He attributes the crisis to rising rents, lack of affordable housing, and stagnant wages.

There are an estimated 4,021 homeless young-adults between the ages of 18 and 24 on any given night in Los Angeles County as of 2019, a 22% increase over 2018, per the Greater Los Angeles Youth Homeless Count (LA Youth Count). The count defines youth as people 24 years old and younger.

Los Angeles spent $619 million on the 36,000 homeless in 2019, approximately $17,194 per homeless person, however homelessness numbers continue to grow. Peter Lynn, head of the Los Angeles Homeless Service Authority (LAHSA) who saw homelessness rise 33% during his five years in spite of $780 million in additional funding, resigned his job at the end of 2019.

City of Los Angeles
According to a 2019 Los Angeles Times poll, 95% of voters called homelessness a serious or very serious problem in the city, more than for any other issue. L.A. County officials reported that in 2019 there were over 39,000 homeless in the city. The Los Angeles Police Department has used citations and fines towards individuals living in public areas as part of the Safer Cities Initiative that began in September 2006.  This Central Police division's initiative entailed assigning fifty full-time officers to clearing out "homeless encampments" to different parts of downtown. Once these areas were cleared, they would stay for seven days before moving on to another area. In 2015, the city was spending roughly $100 million a year on homelessness with approximately half of this funding going to policing the homeless population. Proposition HHH was approved by voters 77% to 23% in 2016. This was a $1.2 billion bond measure to build permanent supportive housing for homeless people and people at risk of becoming homeless. Rising rent and relatively few laws protecting tenants from predatory landlords are significant drivers of surging homelessness in Los Angeles.

City of Santa Monica
Santa Monica experienced a homelessness decrease of 19% downtown with a 3% increase in overall homelessness for 2019.  Positive results are credited to outreach and engagement strategies and to prioritizing homelessness, cited as a Top 10 Santa Monica Story of 2019 which reported on "In the Image", a statue of a homeless man installed in downtown Santa Monica. Rising homeless numbers are attributed to the Los Angeles housing crisis. Santa Monica has approximately 400 emergency shelter beds across 330 permanent supportive housing (PSH) units, and provides an access center for showering, mail, and medical.

Orange County
The 2019 Orange County Point in Time count documented 6,860 homeless people. Per the count, 2,899 homeless had found some type of shelter, while 3,961 had no shelter. The Point in Time count is a federally required biennial census of the homeless to collect demographic data and other information which also determines how much federal funding Orange County will receive to address homelessness issues.

A 2017 census in Orange County, California recorded 4,792 homeless individuals. 193 homeless individuals died in 2017, with drug overdoses and suicides among the population being the leading cause of death.

San Diego
A 2017 count showed 9,100 homeless people throughout San Diego County. Veterans make up a significant portion of this population, with 1,300 homeless veterans. A Hepatitis A outbreak in November 2017 resulted in a declaration of a health emergency, which affected the homeless population due to inadequate sanitation. In response to the health crisis, San Diego opened three emergency shelters which are expected to have an annual cost of $12.9 million to operate. The city approved a 500-bin storage center for homeless people to store their belongings. San Diego has a history of insufficient healthcare provided to the homeless population, with a majority of the homeless population in 1989 lacking any regular access to healthcare.

San Diego's homeless population has fallen in recent years, but is the 6th largest in the United States with 4,801 homeless in 2022. The large count of homeless is juxtaposed by the existence of over 30,000 vacant housing units. San Diego has taken action to alleviate the homeless population living on the streets by encouraging housing within vehicles. In February 2019, San Diego repealed a long-standing law which made living within vehicles illegal. This comes two years after the construction of a parking lot designed to provide safe residence for the homeless who live in their cars, complete with restroom and shower facilities. The City of San Diego currently has 2,040 emergency and bridge shelters for the homeless, providing temporary housing options. The City of San Diego adopted a 'Housing First' program in 2018, which plans 79.7 million dollars in programs assisting the homeless. These programs include temporary housing development, permanent housing development, rent assistance, and incentives for landlords to rent to the homeless.

Sacramento
In August 2019, the city of Sacramento filed a lawsuit against seven transients accused of theft, drugs, assaults and having weapons. The lawsuit seeks to exclude them from the business corridor around Land Park and Curtis Park.

San Francisco

The city of San Francisco, California has a significant and visible homeless problem. Approximately 61% of the homeless population were already living and working in San Francisco when they became homeless, indicating that a majority of people experiencing homelessness did not come to the city for its resources but rather are being priced out of their home. The city's homeless population has been estimated at 7,000–10,000 people, of which approximately 3,000–5,000 refuse shelter due to the conditions within the shelters including violence, racism, and homophobia and transphobia. Additionally, there are only 1,339 available shelter beds for the approximately 10,000 people sleeping outdoors. The city spends $200 million a year on homelessness related programs. On May 3, 2004, San Francisco officially began an attempt to scale back the scope of its homelessness problem by changing its strategy from cash payments to the "Care Not Cash" plan which has had no visible impact on reducing homelessness in the city. In 2010, a city ordinance was passed to disallow sitting and lying down on public sidewalks for most of the day.

An October 2018 report by Leilani Farha, the UN's Special Rapporteur on the Right to Adequate Housing, said that "cruel and inhuman" conditions for homeless people in the Bay Area violate human rights, which include being denied "access to water, sanitation and health services, and other basic necessities." Farha's fact finding mission found conditions in homeless encampments rivaling the most impoverished neighborhoods in Mumbai, Delhi and Mexico City. She urged the Bay Area to provide more affordable housing.

Currently there is a proposition on the Nov 2018 elections ballot (Proposition C), if passed, it would apply tax to the gross receipts of San Francisco's largest companies. The revenue from the tax would add up to $300 million a year to the city's homeless budget (double what it is right now). It would also fund shelters, mental health services, addiction treatment, and prevention to keep people from becoming homeless.

Santa Barbara
The rising cost of rent and property prices has forced hundreds of middle-class people, including teachers, chefs and nurses, to live out of their cars in parking lots. In 2017 a count showed 1,489 homeless individuals. There were 44 deaths in Santa Barbara County in 2016.

Ventura
A preliminary 2018 count released by the Ventura County Continuum of Care Alliance board indicated that the county's population of homeless men, women, and children was 1,299. It was also reported that there was an increase of 24% for the unsheltered population. Overall, in 2017, the City of Ventura experienced a double-digit increase in its homeless population from 2016 and 63 deaths. In recent years, Ventura residents have placed pressure on city leaders to do more about the growing homeless problem.

Youth

Overview
In 2014, it was reported to Congress that 30% of all homeless youth (24 and under) in the United States are located in California. According to the AHAR to Congress for 2020, the number has risen to 36%. As of January 2021, 8% of those who are homeless in California are considered to be youth (under 24) (lao.ca.gov). Many accompanied homeless youth are considered to be "throwaway youth", i.e. adolescents that were forced out of their houses and onto the streets. There may be multiple reasons to explain why this happens such as unaccepting parents of gender identity, sexual orientation, pregnancy, abuse, etc. Other homeless youth may be “runaway youth”, in which people flee their houses and live on the streets. Many victims of abuse, neglect, conflict, or even poverty are often the causes of leaving their houses.

References

Housing in California
California